Altmayer is a surname. Notable people with the surname include:
 Éric and Nicolas Altmayer, French film producers
 René Altmayer (1882–1976), French general
 Robert Altmayer (1875–1959), French army corps general
 Victor Joseph Altmayer (1844–1908), French general